A constitutional referendum was held in Palau on 4 November 1992 to lower the majority threshold requirement for approving the Compact of Free Association with the United States from 75% to 50%. Seven previous referendums had approved the Compact, but not by the majority required. A previous referendum had approved a lowering of the threshold, but was subsequently declared void by the Supreme Court.

The change was approved by 62.4% of voters, with an 83.2% turnout. Following this, an eighth referendum was held the following year, which finally approved the Compact.

Results

References

Palau
1992 in Palau
Referendums in Palau
Constitutional referendums in Palau